BibliU is an education technology company, specialising in digital textbook and monograph provision for  universities,  libraries and other higher education institutions. BibliU is currently partnered with over 130 higher education institutions globally, including the University of Coventry, University of Liverpool and the University of Phoenix.

BibliU was founded in 2013 by former Rhodes Scholar David Sherwood, while he was studying at Oxford University. He cofounded the company with current CTO Daniel Engelke, Tao Mantaras, Ryan White, and Ellis Gecan at the Oxford University startup incubator.

Platform
The company provides e-textbooks to students by negotiating with core book publishers to give access to students and academics at reduced prices. Textbook packages are integrated into school library management systems and packages are adjusted according to a schools' reading lists. The company also has a subscription service for university libraries to make textbook packages searchable in their databases. The first field in which the company had a significant portion of the available textbooks for offer was chemistry, though its provision has expanded significantly into other fields in recent years.

Funding History

In 2018 the company received $4 million in funding from the University of Oxford Innovation Fund III. In 2020, the company received an additional $10m (USD) in  Series A funding, with the investment round led by  Nesta Impact Investments, who announced that "BibliU is playing a leading role in the digital transformation of higher education and seeks to support inclusive access to educational content. BibliU offers all students more cost-effective access to their course materials and in formats that are inclusive and accessible."

BibliU's successful Series A funding round, taking place at the height of the COVID-19 pandemic and associated  economic fallout was covered extensively by Sky News, EdSurge, and Forbes, among others.

Leadership

As of September 2020, BibliU's Board of directors consists of the following individuals,

 Dave Sherwood, CEO and Co-Founder
 Daniel Engelke, CTO and Co-Founder
 Sean Devine, Chairman of the Board, and former CEO of CourseSmart

See also
 Perlego
 Education Technology
 Open Educational Resources

References

2013 establishments in the United States
2013 establishments in the United Kingdom
Textbooks